Clofibric acid is a biologically active metabolite of the lipid-lowering drugs clofibrate, etofibrate and theofibrate with the molecular formula C10H11ClO3. It has been found in the environment following use of these drugs, for example in Swiss lakes and the North Sea.

Some derivatives of clofibric acid are in a drug class called fibrates.

See also
 Phenoxy herbicides to which the compound is chemically related

References

Chloroarenes
2-Methyl-2-phenoxypropanoic acid derivatives